Sumadhva Vijaya (also popularly referred as Sri Madhva Vijaya or simply as Madhva Vijaya) ("The story of the victory of Madhva"), is a hagiographic work of the Dvaita philosopher Sri Madhvacharya. It is authored by Sri Narayana Panditacharya, who was the son of Sri Trivikrama Panditacharya, one of the direct disciples of Madhvacharya. Sri Trivikrama Panditacharya was a famous advaita exponent of his time and converted himself to the Madhva faith after disputation with Sri Madhvacharya himself for 7–8 days in Kasargod of Kerala. He is also the author of the famous "Vayu Stuti" which is recited by all devote Madhvas, daily, till date.

Sumadhva Vijaya is a Sanskrit work and is composed of 16 sargas or cantos. It starts with a description of the first two Avatars of Vayu, namely Hanuman and Bhima. It then proceeds to describe the life of Sri Madhvacharya, who is the third avatar. Sumadhva Vijaya contains detailed descriptions of various incidents of Sri Madhva's life and is the only authentic source of information about Madhvacharya that exists. Sri Narayana Panditacharya was a contemporary of Sri Madhva which greatly adds to the authenticity of the work. The work contains many personal and intimate details of Sri Madhvacharya's daily routine.

Sumadhva Vijaya is a Maha Kavya and its style meets all the requirements of a Maha Kavya of Sanskrit Literature. Sumadhva Vijaya has several commentaries written on it which greatly helps the understanding of the Maha Kavya. Sri Narayana Panditacarya himself has written a commentary on his Maha Kavya Madhva Vijaya. This commentary is called Bhava Prakashika. This is a very useful commentary because the poet himself gives the Kannada and Tulu names of several persons who are a part of Sri Madhvacharya's Biography and the places which Sri Madhvacarya has visited. In the Kavya these names are Sanskritised. The next oldest commentary on Sumadhva Vijaya is by Sri Vedanga Tirtha, one of the saints of the Sode Mutt. This commentary is called Padartha Dipika. Another commentary which is also in vogue is the "Padartha Dipikodbodhika" of Sri Vishwapati Tirtha of Pejavara Mutt. "Mandopakarini" of Sri Chalari Sheshacharya is also quite popular. All the commentaries are in print. Sumadhva Vijaya has also been recited by many artists, such as Sri Vidhyabooshana.

See also
 Digvijaya (conquest)
 Dvaita
 Madhvacharya
 Narayana Panditacharya

References 

 
 Madhwa Vijaya Audio

External links 
 Discourse on Sumadhva Vijaya (Kannada) by Vidwan Vyasanakere Prabhanjanacharya.
 Biographical links to Madhvacharya and other dvaita resources
 Madhva and other Dvaita saints text resource
 Complete Biography of Sriman Madhvacharya

Dvaita Vedanta